Marcel Gaus (born 2 August 1989) is a German professional footballer who plays as a left-back for 3. Liga club 1. FC Saarbrücken.

Club career
Gaus began his career on youth side for SV Hilden-Nord and joined later in the youth team of Fortuna Düsseldorf. On 12 May 2005, made his debut for Fortuna Düsseldorf II in the Oberliga Nordrhein and his professional debut on 2 August 2008 against Stuttgarter Kickers.

In January 2023, Gaus signed for 1. FC Saarbrücken on a contract until the end of the season.

Career statistics

References

External links
 

1989 births
Living people
German footballers
Sportspeople from Hagen
Footballers from North Rhine-Westphalia
Association football fullbacks
Fortuna Düsseldorf II players
Fortuna Düsseldorf players
FSV Frankfurt players
1. FC Kaiserslautern players
FC Ingolstadt 04 players
1. FC Saarbrücken players
2. Bundesliga players
3. Liga players